Jason John Beebe is an American actor and filmmaker. He is known for his starring role in the 2013 film Not Human. He has appeared in several low-budget horror films, including Snow Shark, Sharknado 2: The Second One, and A Grim Becoming. He is set to appear in the upcoming films Lake Effect and Fang.

Selected filmography

As actor
 Snow Shark (2012)
 Battledogs (2013)
 Not Human (2013)
 Sharknado 2: The Second One (2014)
 A Grim Becoming (2014)
 Lake Effect (TBA)
 Fang (2018)

References

External links
 
 
 

Year of birth missing (living people)
Living people
Filmmakers from New York (state)
Film directors from New York (state)
American film producers
American male film actors
Screenwriters from New York (state)